Liz Harris is a state legislator and real estate broker in Arizona. She won the 2022 election for a seat in the Arizona House of Representatives. She is a Republican representing District 13 which includes much of Chandler, Arizona.

After the 2020 Arizona election, Harris led a door-to-door canvassing campaign in an effort to find election anomalies, via inflated registered voter rolls, which drew attention from the United States Justice Department on concerns of potential voter intimidation. 

She also alleged foul play in the 2022 Arizona elections in which Republicans lost top statewide races, and said she would not cast any vote in the House until the election was redone. In February 2023, Harris invited Jacqueline Breger, a principal investigator with the Thaler Harris law firm and an insurance agent, to testify before a joint hearing of Republican-controlled House and Senate elections committees. Breger alleged governor Katie Hobbs and numerous judges and other elected officials took bribes from the Sinaloa Cartel via money laundered through a housing deed scam. Some Arizona Republican legislators, who for years had entertained unsubstantiated claims of election fraud, rushed to disavow the allegations.  

Harris has promoted the QAnon conspiracy theory.

References

Members of the Arizona House of Representatives
21st-century American politicians

Year of birth missing (living people)
Living people